Norcasia is a town and municipality in the Colombian Department of Caldas.

Climate
Norcasia has a very wet tropical rainforest climate (Af).

References

External links
  Norcasia official website

Municipalities of Caldas Department